Aliabad-e Zarein (also Romanized as ‘Alīābād-e Zāre‘īn; also known as ‘Alīābād) is a village in Qaleh Zari Rural District, Jolgeh-e Mazhan District, Khusf County, South Khorasan Province, Iran. At the 2006 census, its population was 260, in 73 families.

References 

Populated places in Khusf County